The Cathedral of Our Lady of the Immaculate Conception (Portuguese language: Catedral de Nossa Senhora da Imaculada Conceição) is a Roman Catholic cathedral in downtown Maputo, the capital of Mozambique. The cathedral is located on Praça da Independência (Independence Square) next to Hotel Rovuma and Maputo City Hall. It is dedicated to Our Lady of the Immaculate Conception. The foundation stone for the construction of the church was laid on June 28, 1936, and is located inside the narthex and inscribed by the Bishop of Mozambique and Cape Verde, D. Rafael Maria da Asunção. Construction on the cathedral was completed in 1944.

The cathedral was designed by the Portuguese civil engineer Marcial Simões de Freitas e Costa, then a railway director. He designed the church pro bono for the Archdiocese of Lourenço Marques. Freitas was inspired by the simple style and building materials of church construction in Europe of the time; the cathedral was ultimately built of concrete and cement. He was inspired to buildings such as the Notre-Dame du Raincy in Le Raincy (1921-1923) by Auguste Perret and Igreja de Nossa Senhora de Fátima (1934-1938) in Lisbon, built by Pardal Monteiro. The simplicity and the choice of new materials was also a result of financial problems of the period.

References

Buildings and structures in Maputo
Tourist attractions in Maputo
Roman Catholic cathedrals in Mozambique
Roman Catholic churches completed in 1944
1944 establishments in Portuguese Mozambique
Portuguese colonial architecture in Mozambique
20th-century Roman Catholic church buildings